The 1967 season of the Paraguayan Primera División, the top category of Paraguayan football, was played by 9 teams. The national champions were Guaraní.

Results

Standings

Second-place play-offs

Relegation play-offs

References

External links
Paraguay 1967 season at RSSSF

Para
Paraguayan Primera División seasons